Luke Crane (born 23 June 1985) is a former Australian rules footballer who played with Sturt Football Club in the South Australian National Football League (SANFL). 

Originally from George Town in Tasmania, Crane was recruited to Sturt from Queensland club Zillmere. He played 125 games for Sturt and won the 2008 Magarey Medal as the best and fairest player in the SANFL.

Notes

External links 

1985 births
Living people
Sturt Football Club players
Zillmere Eagles Australian Football Club players
Magarey Medal winners
Australian rules footballers from Tasmania
Portland Football Club players
Tasmanian Football Hall of Fame inductees